The name Robert is an ancient Germanic given name, from Proto-Germanic  "fame" and  "bright" (Hrōþiberhtaz). Compare Old Dutch Robrecht and Old High German Hrodebert (a compound of Hruod "fame, glory, honour, praise, renown" and berht "bright, light, shining"). It is the second most frequently used given name of ancient Germanic origin. It is also in use as a surname. Another commonly used form of the name is Rupert.

After becoming widely used in Continental Europe it entered England in its Old French form Robert, where an Old English cognate form (Hrēodbēorht, Hrodberht, Hrēodbēorð, Hrœdbœrð, Hrœdberð, Hrōðberχtŕ) had existed before the Norman Conquest. The feminine version is Roberta. The Italian, Portuguese, and Spanish form is Roberto.

Robert is also a common name in many Germanic languages, including English, German, Dutch, Norwegian, Swedish, Scots, Danish, and Icelandic. It can be used as a French, Polish, Irish, Finnish, Romanian, and Estonian name as well.

Variations

Popularity and trivia

The name Robert was a royal name in France, Germany, Scotland and England during the medieval period, and was the name of several kings, dukes, and other rulers and noblemen. It was one of the most popular male names in medieval Europe, likely due to its frequent usage amongst royalty and nobility. To this day, Robert remains one of the most frequently given male names.

Robert was in the top 10 most given boys' names in the United States for 47 years, from 1925 to 1972. While some names become less frequently used due to negative associations, Robert is still widely used despite its connection to many negatively evaluated historical figures.

It is the fourth most common name in the United States, according to 100 years of Social Security Administration naming and mortality data.  There are 3,085,000 males and 13,571 females  with this name, for a total of 3,098,571 people with this name.

In Italy during the Second World War, the form of the name, Roberto, briefly acquired a new meaning derived from, and referring to the Rome-Berlin-Tokyo Axis.

The name's second component, *berhta-, is the original root for the modern English word "bright".<ref></ref

People named Robert

Royalty 

Kings of Scotland
 Robert I of Scotland (1274–1329) ("Robert the Bruce"), king and national hero of Scotland, legendary for his victory at the Battle of Bannockburn, one of the most prominent and skilled warriors of his time who freed Scotland from the English rule during the Wars of Scottish Independence
 Robert II of Scotland (Robert Stewart) (1316–1390), one of the principal commanders at the Battle of Halidon Hill
 Robert III of Scotland (c. 1337/40–1406)

Kings of France
 Robert I of France (c.866–923)
 Robert II of France (972–1031)

King of Naples
 Robert of Naples (1276–1343)

King of Germany
 Robert of Germany (Rupertus, Rex Romanorum) (1352–1410)

King of Hungary and Croatia
 Charles I Robert (1288–1342)

King of Bulgaria
 Robert of Bulgaria, Tsar of the Kingdom of Bulgaria (1894–1943), one of the principal commanders of European theatre of World War II

Dukes of Normandy
 Robert I, Duke of Normandy (1000–1035), also known as Robert the Magnificent or Robert the Devil; father of William the Conqueror
 Robert Curthose (c.1051–1134, son of William the Conqueror, claimant to throne of Kingdom of England.

Duke of Chartres
 Prince Robert, Duke of Chartres, Crown Prince of France (1840–1910)

Duke of Parma
 Robert I, Duke of Parma (1848–1907)

Count of Flanders
 Robert I, Count of Flanders (c.1035–1093)
 Robert II, Count of Flanders (c.1065–1111).

Crown Prince of Bavaria
 Robert I, crown prince of Bavaria (1869–1955), also known as Prince Rupprecht, last heir apparent to the Bavarian throne.

Latin Emperor and Emperor of Constantinople
 Robert I, Latin Emperor (d. 1228), Emperor of the Latin Empire and Constantinopole

Duke of Sicily and Prince of Benevento
 Robert Guiscard (c. 1015–1085), Norman nobleman, adventurer and explorer, leader of the conquest of southern Italy and Sicily

Medieval figures
 Robert III of Artois (1287–1342), Lord of Conches-en-Ouche, of Domfront, and of Mehun-sur-Yèvre, Earl of Richmond.
 Robert of Bellême, 3rd Earl of Shrewsbury, Anglo-Norman nobleman, and one of the most prominent figures in the competition for the succession to England and Normandy, member of the House of Bellême
 Robert de Craon (died 1147), the second Grand Master of the Knights Templar from June 1136 until his death.
 Robert de Juilly (died 1377), Grand Master of the Knights Hospitaller from 1374 to his death
 Robert IV of Sablé (1150–1193), eleventh Grand Master of the Knights Templar from 1191 to 1192 and Lord of Cyprus from 1191 to 1192.

Folk heroes
 Robert Huntington, known as Robin Hood, legendary heroic outlaw and nobleman originally depicted in English folklore, highly skilled archer and swordsman, sometimes regarded as a national hero of England
 Robert Roy Macgregor (1671–1734), Scottish outlaw and national hero

Nobility 
 Robert Benson, 1st Baron Bingley
 Robert Bertie, 1st Earl of Lindsey
 Robert Bruce, 1st Earl of Ailesbury
 Robert Carey, 1st Earl of Monmouth
 Robert Carr, 1st Earl of Somerset
 Robert Cecil, 1st Viscount Cecil of Chelwood, British lawyer, politician and diplomat, one of the architects of the League of Nations;
 Robert Cecil, 1st Earl of Salisbury
 Sir Robert Dashwood, 1st Baronet, English politician
 Robert Devereux, 2nd Earl of Essex, English nobleman and military commander
 Robert Dudley, 1st Earl of Leicester, British statesman and military commander, governor-general of British Empire
 Robert Devereux, 3rd Earl of Essex, British nobleman and military leader in English Civil War and Roundhead
 Robert Finlay, 1st Viscount Finlay, Lord High Chancellor of Great Britain
 Sir Robert Gordon, 1st Baronet, Scottish politician and courtier
 Robert Greville, 2nd Baron Brooke, English Baron, military commander and Roundhead general
 Robert Harley, British statesman and Master of the Mint
 Robert Henley, 1st Earl of Northington, Lord High Chancellor of Great Britain
 Robert Herbert, 12th Earl of Pembroke 
 Sir Robert Inglis, 2nd Baronet, English Conservative politician;
 Robert Kerr, 1st Earl of Ancram
 Robert Kerr, 1st Marquess of Lothian
 Sir Robert Kingsmill, 1st Baronet, Royal navy officer
 Robert III de La Marck, Seigneur of Fleuranges, Marshal of France
 Robert Maxwell, 1st Earl of Nithsdale, Scottish nobleman and military commander
 Robert Maxwell, 5th Lord Maxwell, Scottish soldier and nobleman, member of the Council of Regency of the Kingdom of Scotland, Regent of the Isle of Arran, patriarch of the House of Maxwell/Clan Maxwell
 Robert Paston, 1st Earl of Yarmouth
 Sir Robert Peel, 1st Baronet, British politician and industrialist and one of early textile manufacturers of the Industrial Revolution, father of Sir Robert Peel, twice Prime Minister of the United Kingdom
 Robert Pierrepont, 1st Earl of Kingston-upon-Hull
 Robert Raymond, 1st Baron Raymond
 Robert Reid, 1st Earl Loreburn
 Robert Rich, 2nd Earl of Warwick
 Robert Rolfe, 1st Baron Cranworth, Lord High Chancellor of Great Britain
 Lord Robert Walpole, 2nd Earl of Orford, British peer and politician
 Robert Windsor-Clive, 1st Earl of Plymouth, British nobleman and Conservative politician
 Robert Stewart, 1st Marquess of Londonderry 
 Robert Stewart, Viscount Castlereagh, Irish/British statesman, and British Foreign Secretary

Religious figures and saints 

 Saint Robert Bellarmine (died in 1621), Jesuit Doctor of the Church, one of the leaders of Roman Inquisition and Galileo affair
 Saint Robert of Bury (died 1181)
 Robert Holman, 36th Abbot of Ten Duinen Abbey
 Saint Robert of Molesme (d. 1111), founder of the Cistercian Order
 Saint Robert of Newminster (d. 1159), established the Abbey of Newminster at Morpeth, Northumberland
 Roberto de Nobili (1577–1656),  Italian Jesuit missionary to Southern India
 Roberto de' Nobili (1541–1559), Roman Catholic cardinal
 Robert de Sorbon (1201–1274), French theologian and founder of College of Sorbonne
 Saint Robert de Turlande (d. 1067), founding abbot of the Abbey of Casa Dei, also called Chaise-Dieu

Presidents and prime ministers
British Prime Ministers
 Lord Robert Gascoyne-Cecil, 3rd Marquess of Salisbury, British statesman, serving as Prime Minister three times for a total 
 Robert Harley, 1st Earl of Oxford and Earl Mortimer, Lord High Treasurer of the British Empire, sometimes regarded as the first Prime Minister of Great Britain
 Robert Jenkinson, 2nd Earl of Liverpool, British statesman and Prime Minister of the United Kingdom from 1812 to 1827, Secretary of State for War and the Colonies
 Sir Robert Peel, British statesman who served as Prime Minister of the United Kingdom, father of modern British policing, leader of Peelite, founder of Conservative Party of United Kingdom and the Metropolitan Police Service
 Sir Robert Walpole, British statesman who served as the first Prime Minister of Great Britain
Australian Prime Ministers
 Robert "Bob" Hawke, Australian politician who served as Prime Minister of Australia and Leader of the Labor Party
 Sir Robert Menzies, Australian politician who twice served as Prime Minister of Australia, in office from 1939 to 1941 and again from 1949 to 1966
Presidents and Prime Ministers from North America
 Sir Robert Borden, Canadian lawyer and politician who served as the eighth prime minister of Canada
 Robert F. Kennedy, American politician and lawyer who served as the 64th United States Attorney General, United States Senator for New York, brother of the U.S. president John F. Kennedy
Presidents and Prime Ministers from Asia / Oceania
 Robert Kocharyan, Armenian politician who served as the first president of Nagorno-Karabakh Republic and the second president of Armenia between 1998 and 2008
 Robert Bulwer-Lytton, 1st Earl of Lytton, English statesman, Conservative politician, and poet, who served as Viceroy of India (Governor-General) between 1876 and 1880 and British Ambassador to France from 1887 to 1891
 Sir Robert Stout, New Zealand politician who served as 13th Prime Minister of New Zealand on two occasions in the 19th century, and later Chief Justice of New Zealand
Presidents and Prime Ministers from Europe
 Robert Abela, Maltese lawyer and politician, currently serving as the 14th prime minister of Malta
 Robert Fico, Slovak politician who served as Prime Minister of Slovakia from 2012 to 2018
 Robert Haab, Swiss politician and President of Switzerland
 Robert Schuman, Luxembourg-born French statesman, Christian Democrat, activist, Prime Minister of France, a reformist Minister of Finance and a Foreign Minister, one of the founders of the European Union, the Council of Europe and NATO;
 Robert Themptander, Swedish politician and public official who served as Prime Minister of Sweden from 1884 to 1888
Presidents and Prime Ministers from Central / South America
 Roberto Micheletti, Honduran politician who served as the president of Honduras following the 2009 Honduran coup d'état
 Roberto María Ortiz, 19th president of Argentina during the Infamous Decade
 Roberto Suazo Córdova, 29th President of Honduras
 Roberto Sánchez Vilella, Governor of Puerto Rico, Head of State and Head of Government of Puerto Rico

Dictators
 Baron Robert Clive (1725–1774), British army officer and privateer who established the military and political supremacy of the East India Company in Bengal, served as the Commander-in-Chief of British India
 Robert Mugabe (1924–2019), former Zimbabwean politician and revolutionary, Prime Minister of Zimbabwe from 1980 to 1987 and President (Dictator) from 1987 to 2017

Secretaries of Defense
 Robert Gates (1943), American statesman, scholar, intelligence analyst, and university president who served as the director of Central Intelligence Agency (CIA), Director of Central Intelligence and 22nd United States Secretary of Defense from 2006 to 2011
 Robert A. Lovett (1895–1986), fourth United States Secretary of Defense
 Robert McNamara (1916–2009), American business executive and the eighth United States Secretary of Defense

Wartime figures and military leaders

American army
 Robert N. Adams, American Brevet Brigadier General during the American Civil War
 Robert S. Beightler, American military officer, major General, military governor of Okinawa, War Department General Staff, commander of the 37th Infantry Division
 Robert C. Bradshaw, American Brevet Brigadier General during the American Civil War
 Robert C. Buchanan, American military officer, one of the principal commanders of Black Hawk War and Rogue River Wars
 Robert Lee Bullard, senior officer in the United States Army during World War I
 Robert L. Eichelberger, general officer in the United States Army who commanded the Eighth United States Army in the Southwest Pacific Area during World War II
 Robert L. Ghormley, admiral in the United States Navy, serving as Commander of South Pacific Area during World War II
 Robert Hoke, Confederate major general during the American Civil War
 Robert B. Johnston, retired United States Marine Corps lieutenant general whose last duty assignment was as Commander, Marine Forces Atlantic Marine Forces Europe and II Marine Expeditionary Force
 Robert E. Lee, American and Confederate general, supreme commander of the Confederate States Army during American Civil War
 Robert A. Lewis, United States Army Air Forces officer serving in the Pacific Theatre during World War II, one of the pilots of the Enola G
 Robert McDade, United States Army colonel,
 Robert McGowan Littlejohn, major general in the United States Army, leader of War Assets Administration
 Robert C. Murphy, American colonel during the American Civil War
 Robert "Robin" Olds Jr., American fighter pilot and general officer in the U.S. Air Force
 Robert Olds Sr., general officer in the US Army Air Forces
 Robert Patterson, Irish-born United States major general during the American Civil War
 Robert W. Porter Jr., United States Army four-star general who served as Commander in Chief, United States Southern Command from 1965 to 1969
 Robert Gould Shaw, American officer in the Union Army during the American Civil War, commander of the first all-African American regiment
 Robert Sink, senior United States Army officer who fought during World War II, the Korean War, and early parts of the Vietnam War
 Robert G. Smith (colonel) (1854-1923), American colonel of the Spanish–American War
 Robert F. Stockton, United States Navy commodore, United States Senator from New Jersey, Military Governor of California
 Robert A. Theobald, United States Navy officer who served in World War I and World War II, achiever of the rank of rear admiral, the air forces commander during Attack on Pearl Harbor
 Robert F. Travis, United States Army Air Forces general during World War II
 Robert Toombs, American lawyer, planter, army general, and politician from Georgia who became one of the organizers of the Confederacy and served as its first Secretary of State
 Robert Treat, American colonial leader, militia officer and governor of the Connecticut Colony between  1683 and 1698 and the founder of Newark, New Jersey
 Robert C. Tyler, Confederate brigadier general during the American Civil War
 Robert O. Tyler, American soldier who served as a general in the Union Army during the American Civil War

British / Scottish army
 Sir Robert Abercromby, British general
 Robert Baden-Powell, 1st Baron Baden-Powell, British Army officer, writer, founder and first Chief Scout of the world-wide Boy Scout Movement
 Robert Blake, British Royal Navy officer and one of the most important military commanders of the Commonwealth of England
 Robert Brooke-Popham, senior commander in the Royal Air Force and leader of Operation Matador (1941)
 Robert Brownrigg, British statesman, general and soldier who brought the last part of Sri Lanka under British rule, Governors of British Ceylon, General Officer Commanding, Ceylon
 Sir Robert Calder, British naval officer
 Robert H. Dick, Scottish soldier
 Robert Rollo Gillespie, officer in the British Army
 Robert Haining, British Army officer
Robert Peverell Hichens, British Lieutenant Commander and the most highly decorated officer of the Royal Navy Volunteer Reserve (RNVR)
 Robert Kekewich, British Army officer
 Sir Robert Mansell, English Royal Navy officer and a member of parliament (MP), mostly for Welsh constituencies
 Robert Monckton, officer of the British Army and also a colonial administrator in British North America
 Robert Munro, 18th Baron of Foulis, known as the Black Baron, Scottish soldier and military warlord
 Robert Monro, Scottish general during Thirty Years' War
 Sir Robert Moray, Scottish soldier, statesman, diplomat, judge, spy and natural philosopher, one of the founders of Royal Society and Freemasonry
 Robert Orme, British soldier and military leader
 Sir Robert Pigot, 2nd Baronet, British Army officer during the American Revolutionary War
 Robert Rogers, American colonial frontiersman and officer in the British Army, commander of Rogers' Rangers
 Robert Ross, officer in the British Army, born in Ireland
 Robert Sale, British army officer
 Sir Robert Stopford, distinguished officer in the Royal Navy
 Robert Stanford Tuck, British fighter pilot, flying ace, and test pilot, member of the Royal Air Force, war hero of World War II
 Robert Sturges, British Royal marine general
 Robert "Roy" Urquhart, British Army officer
 Robert Whittaker, City of London banker and a senior officer in Britain's part-time Territorial Army (TA), chief of staff at Anti-Aircraft Command during World War II

Australian army
 Robert A. Little, World War I fighter pilot and the most successful Australian flying ace

German / Austrian army
 Robert von Eggenberg, Austrian colonel-general
 Robert Gysae, a German U-boat commander in the Kriegsmarine during World War II
 Robert Ritter von Greim, German Field Marshal and pilot
 Robert Kosch, Prussian general in the Imperial German army
 Robert Zapp, German U-boat commander in World War II

Irish army 
 Robert Emmet, Irish Republican, orator and rebel leader
 Cuban army
 Roberto Rodriguez Fernandez, Cuban revolutionary

Italian army
 Roberto Farinacci, leading Italian Fascist politician and important member of the Grand Council of Fascism, Secretary of National Fascist Party and one of the leading perpetrators of the Holocaust in Italy

French army
 Robert Nivelle, French artillery officer who led the French forces during World War I as commander in-chief of French army

Russian army
 Robert Bruce, first chief commander of Saint Petersburg
 Robert Segercrantz, Russian general in the Russian Imperial army
 Robert von Ungern-Sternberg, also known as The Mad Baron or The Bloody White Baron, Austrian-born, Russian Empire's Baltic German anti-Bolshevik lieutenant general in the Russian Civil War
 Robert Viren, general, admiral and career naval officer in the Imperial Russian Navy in Russian Empire

Other military
 Robert B. Abrams, four-star general in the United States Army
 Robert Bartels (1911–1943), German U-boat commander in World War II
 Robert Grierson Combe, Scottish-Canadian military officer
 Robert E. Cushman Jr., United States Marine Corps general who served as the 25th Commandant of the Marine Corps
 Robert Duff, British Royal Navy officer
 Robert Kajuga, national president and leader of the MRND-affiliated extremist militia, the Interahamwe
 Robert J. Miller, United States Army Special Forces soldier
 Robert Miller Montague, lieutenant general in the United States Army
 Robert Neller, retired United States Marine Corps four-star general who served as the 37th Commandant of the Marine Corps
 Robert H. Reed, General in the United States Air Force and the former chief of staff of the Supreme Headquarters Allied Powers Europe
 Robert Rheault, American colonel in the U.S. Army Special Forces
 Robert Roddam, British Royal Navy officer
 Robert M. Shoemaker, United States Army general and former commander of the United States Army Forces Command, inductee into the Aviation Hall of Fame

Nazis and communists
 Robert Eikhe, Latvian Bolshevik, provincial head of the Communist Party of the Soviet Union in Siberia
 Robert Grawitz, Nazi German physician and an SS functionary, chief physician of the SS, head of the German Red Cross
 Robert Ley, DAF Führer of Nazi Germany (head of the German Labour Front), high-ranking member of the SS, labour and economical leader of Nazi Germany, founder of Volkswagen, creator of NSDAP School system
 Robert Mulka, German Nazi SS-Hauptsturmführer and later SS-Obersturmführer, commander of Auschwitz concentration camp
 Robert Ritter, Nazi German "racial scientist" doctor of psychology and medicine, with a background in child psychiatry and the biology of criminality
 Robert Wagner, Gauleiter of Gau Baden, Gauleiter of Alsace and head of the civil government of Alsace during the Nazi German occupation of France during World War II

Nuclear physicists
 Robert Oppenheimer (1904—1967), American theoretical physicist, professor of physics at the University of California, developer and inventor of the atomic bomb
 Robert Serber (1909—1997), American physicist who participated in the Manhattan Project

Explorers
 Robert Ballard, retired United States Navy officer and a professor of oceanography at the University of Rhode Island
 Robert Bartlett, Newfoundland-born American Arctic explorer of the late 19th and early 20th centuries, accompanied United States Navy Commander Robert Peary on his attempts to reach the North Pole
 Robert O'Hara Burke, Irish soldier and police officer who explored Australia, leader of the first expedition to cross Australia from south to north
 Robert Dudley, English explorer and cartographer
 Sir Robert McClure, Irish explorer of the Arctic who in 1854 traversed the Northwest Passage by boat and sledge and was the first to circumnavigate the Americas
 Robert Peary, American explorer and United States Navy officer who made several expeditions to the Arctic, reached the geographic North Pole with his expedition on April 6, 1909, believed to be the first man to have ever reached the North Pole
 Robert Falcon Scott, British Royal Navy officer and explorer who led two expeditions to the Antarctic regions
 Robert Swan, the first person to walk to both Poles

Intelligence officers
 Robert P. Ashley Jr., retired lieutenant general in the United States Army who served as the Director of the Defense Intelligence Agency from 2017 to 2020
 Robert Hanssen, former Federal Bureau of Investigation (FBI) secret agent who spied for Soviet and Russian intelligence services against the United States from 1979 to 2001
 Robert S. Mueller III, American attorney who served as the sixth Director of the Federal Bureau of Investigation (FBI) from 2001 to 2013

Movie industry
 Robert Altman (1925–2006), American film director, screenwriter, and producer
 Robert "Robbie" Amell (born 1988), Canadian-American actor and producer
 Robert "Rob" Benedict (born 1970), American actor and writer
 Robert "Bob" Bergen, American voice actor
 Robert Carlyle (born 1961), Scottish actor
 Robert "Bob" Chapek (born 1960), American media executive and businessman, chairman of Disney Parks, Experiences and Products, the current CEO of Walt Disney Company
 Robert "Robbie" Coltrane (born 1950), Scottish actor and author
 Robert Cummings (1910–1990), American actor
 Robert Davi (born 1954), American actor
 Robert De Niro (born 1953), American actor, director and producer
 Robert FitzGerald Diggs (born 1969), American rapper, actor, filmmaker, and record producer known as RZA
 Robert Downey Sr. (1936–2021), American actor, director and producer
 Robert Downey Jr. (born 1965), American actor
 Roberto Draghetti (1960–2020), Italian actor and voice actor
 Robert Duvall (born 1931), American actor
 Robert Eggers (born 1983), American film director, screenwriter and production designer
 Robert Englund (born 1947), American actor, voice actor, singer and film director
 Robert Fuller, American horse rancher and actor 
 Robert Goulet (1933–2007), French-Canadian singer and actor
 Robert Guillaume (1927–2017), American actor and singer
 Robert Gustafsson (born 1964), Swedish comedian and actor
 Robert Hardy (1925–2017), British actor
 Robert Hays (born 1947), American actor 
 Robert Hegyes, American actor
 Robert "Bob" Iger (born 1951), American media executive, film producer, author and businessman, chairman and chief executive officer of The Walt Disney Company
 Robert Iler (born 1985), American actor
 Robert Irwin (born 2003), Australian television personality and wildlife photographer
 Robert "Rob" Kardashian (born 1987), American television personality
 Robert Knepper (born 1959), American actor
 Robert Lansing (1928–1994), American stage, film and television actor
 Robert "Rob" Letterman (born 1970), American film director and screenwriter
 Robert "Rob" Lowe (born 1964), American actor, producer and director
 Robert "Rob" Marshall (born 1960), American film and theater director, producer and choreographer
 Robert McKimson (1910–1977), American animator and illustrator, best known for his work on creating the Looney Tunes and Merrie Melodies series of cartoons
 Robert Duncan McNeill (born 1964), American director, producer, and actor
 Robert "Rob" Minkoff (born 1962), American film and animation director
 Robert Mitchum (1917–1997), American film actor, director, author, poet, composer and singer
 Robert Montgomery (1904–1981), American actor, director and producer
 Robert Mulligan (1925–2008), American film director
 Robert Patrick (born 1958), American actor and voice actor
 Robert Pattinson (born 1986), British actor
 Robert "Bob" Peck (1945–1999), English stage, television and film actor
 Robert Redford,(born 1936), American actor, director and producer
 Robert Rodriguez (born 1968), American film director, screenwriter, producer, musician, filmmaker and visual effects supervisor, best known for his film Alita: Battle Angel
 Robert Ryan (1909–1973), American actor
 Robert Schwentke,(born 1968), German film director
 Robert Sheehan (born 1988), Irish actor
 Robert Singer, American film director and producer
 Robert Smigel (born 1960), American actor, voice actor, comedian, humorist, writer, director, producer and puppeteer
 Robert Adolf Stemmle (1903–1974), German screenwriter and film director
 Robert Stromberg (born 1965), American special effects artist, designer and film director
 Robert Taylor (1911–1969) American actor, one of the most famous Hollywood actors of his time
 Robert Vaughn (1932–2016), American actor
 Robert Wagner (born 1930), American actor
 Robert Walker (1918–1951), American actor
 Robert B. Weide (born 1959, American screenwriter, producer and director
 Robert Wiene (1873—1938),  film director of the silent era of German cinema
 Robert Wise (1914–2005), American film director
 Robert Young (1907–1998), American actor
 Robert Zemeckis (born 1952), Lithuanian-Italian born American film director, screenwriter and producer, best known for his "Back to the Future" film trilogy, frequently credited as an innovator in visual effects

Musicians
Record producers and DJs
 Robert Abisi, member of the electronic music and DJ duo Lost Kings
 Robert Babicz, Polish born German electronic music producer, DJ and mastering engineer
 Robert van de Corput, real name of the award-winning Dutch DJ, twice worlds No.1 DJ, composer and music producer Hardwell;
 Robert DeLong, American electronic musician, record producer, composer and performer
 Robert Hughes, real name of the Canadian trap music DJ and record producer known as Vincent and Tiger Drool;
 Robert Miles, Swiss-born Italian DJ and record producer, inventor of the dream trance genre;
 Robert "Bob" Rifo, founder of the Italian electronic music project The Bloody Beetroots
 Robert "Rob" Swire, Australian electronic music producer and DJ

Singers
 Roberto Carlos, Brazilian singer-songwriter, also known as King of Latin Music or simply The King
 Robert "Bob" Chilcott, British choral composer, conductor, and singer
 Robert "Bob" Crosby, American jazz singer and bandleader, best known for his group the Bob-Cats
 Robert "Bobby" Darin, American singer, songwriter, multi-instrumentalist, impressionist, and actor
 Robert Francis, American multi-instrumentalist, singer, songwriter;
 Robert Kelly, American singer, songwriter, record producer, and former semi-professional basketball player who helped redefine R&B and hip hop, earning the nicknames "King of R&B" and "King of Pop-Soul"
 Robert Johnson, American blues singer-songwriter and musician
 Robert "Bob" Marley, Jamaican singer-songwriter
 Robert "Bobby" McFerrin, American musician, singer, conductor, arranger and record producer
 Roberto "Bert" Nievera, Filipino-American singer
 Robert Palmer, English composer, songwriter, singer and record producer;
 Robert Ritchie, American singer-songwriter, rapper, musician, record producer, and actor known as Kid Rock
 Robert "Bob" Seger, American singer-songwriter and guitarist
 Robert Tepper, American songwriter, composer, recording artist and singer
 Robert "Bobby" Vee, American singer, songwriter, musician and teen idol
 Robert "Robbie" Williams, British singer and songwriter
 Robert "Rob" Zombie, American musician, singer, songwriter, programmer, voice actor, filmmaker and founding member of the heavy metal band White Zombie
 Robert Allen Zimmerman, real name of American singer-songwriter Bob Dylan

Band members
 Robert "Rob" Bourdon, American musician, drummer and founding member of the rock band Linkin Park
 Robert Fripp, English musician, songwriter, and record producer, best known as the guitarist, founder and longest-lasting member of the band King Crimson 
 Robert "Rob" Halford, English singer and songwriter, lead vocalist of the Grammy Award-winning heavy metal band Judas Priest, also a member of Fight, Two, Halford, Great White and Black Sabbath
 Robert Hunter, American poet, principle lyricist for the rock band Grateful Dead
 Robert "Rob" Hyman, American singer, songwriter, keyboard and accordion player, producer, arranger, recording studio owner and a founding member of the rock band The Hooters
 Robert Janson, Polish composer, singer, guitarist, leader and co-founder of the band Varius Manx
 Robert "Robby" Krieger, American guitarist and singer-songwriter best known as the guitarist of the rock band The Doors, inducted into the Rock and Roll Hall of Fame
 Robert Del Naja, British artist, musician, singer and songwriter, founding member of the band Massive Attack
 Robert Plant, English singer, songwriter, and musician, lead singer and lyricist of the English rock band Led Zeppelin
 Robert Smith, lead singer of The Cure
 Robert Trujillo, American singer and songwriter, one of the members of American heavy metal band Metallica
 Robert "Bob" Weir, American musician and songwriter, one of the founders of the rock band Grateful Dead, also a member of bands The Other Ones, The Dead, Kingfish, Bobby and the Midnites, RatDog, Furthur and Dead & Company

Rappers
 Robert Rihmeek Williams, American rapper, singer and activist known as Meek Mill
 Robert van Winkle, real name of American rapper, actor, and television host Vanilla Ice

Composers
 Robert Kajanus, Finnish composer, conductor and teacher, founder of the Helsinki Philharmonic Orchestra
 Robert Schumann, German composer and music critic, one of the greatest composers of romantic era
 Robert Volkmann, German composer
 Robert "Bob" Wiseman, Canadian film composer, songwriter and music teacher

Instrumentalists
 Robert "Rob" Barrett, guitarist for death metal band Cannibal Corpse 
 Robert "Bobby" Hackett, American jazz musician
 Robert "Bob" Kerr, comic musician who plays trumpet and cornet
 Robert Mirabal, Native American musician and flute player
 Robert "Rob" Scallon, American YouTuber, musician and multi-instrumentalist

Scientists
 Robert Boyle, British natural philosopher, chemist, physicist, and inventor, first modern chemist, and one of the founders of modern chemistry
 Robert Bunsen, German chemist who discovered caesium in 1860 and rubidium in 1861, pioneer of photochemistry and organoarsenic chemistry and developer of the Bunsen burner
 Robert F. Christy, Canadian-American theoretical physicist, astrophysicist, one of the last surviving people to have worked on the Manhattan Project during World War II
 Robert Dorsey Coale, American chemist and colonel, Professor and Dean at the University of Maryland, Baltimore
 Robert Darwin, English medical doctor, father of the naturalist Charles Robert Darwin
 Robert Esnault-Pelterie, French aircraft designer and spaceflight theorist, developer of ballistic missiles, father of modern rocketry
 Robert Fulton, American engineer and inventor who is widely credited with developing a commercially successful steamboat known as North River Steamboat
 Robert H. Goddard, American engineer, professor, physicist, and inventor, credited with creating and building the world's first liquid-fueled rocket, father of modern rocketry
 Robert C. Green, American medical geneticist, physician, and public health researcher
 Robert J. Van de Graaff, engineer and physicist, inventor of high-voltage Van de Graaff generators
 Robert Gardiner Hill, British surgeon specialising in the treatment of lunacy
 Robert Hooke, English natural philosopher, architect and polymath, best known for discovering and naming the cell in 1665
 Sir Robert Jones, 1st Baronet, Welsh orthopaedic surgeon who helped to establish the modern specialty of orthopaedic surgery in Britain, early proponent of the use of radiography in orthopaedics, and described the eponymous Jones fracture
 Robert Koch, German physician and microbiologist, founder of modern bacteriology, received the Nobel Prize in Physiology or Medicine in 1905 for his research on Tuberculosis
 Robert Liston, Scottish surgeon
 Robert F. Maronde (1920–2008), professor at University of Southern California Medical School
 Robert Andrews Millikan, American experimental physicist honored with the Nobel Prize for Physics in 1923 for the measurement of the elementary electric charge and for his work on the photoelectric effect
 Sir Robert Robinson, Nobel Prize and Medal of Freedom winning British organic chemist
 Robert A. Rolfe, English botanist specialising in the study of orchids
 Robert Shapiro, professor emeritus of chemistry at New York University, best known for his work on the origin of life
 Robert Winston, British professor, medical doctor, scientist
 Robert Crooke Wood, American physicist and neurologist during the American Civil War
 Robert W. Wood, American physicist and inventor who is often cited as being a pivotal contributor to the field of optics and a pioneer of infrared photography and ultraviolet photography
 Robert J. White, American neurosurgeon best known for his head transplants on living monkeys

Prison officials
 Robert McKenty, warden of Eastern State Penitentiary
 Robert J. Kirby, 45th commandant of Sing Sing prison

Criminals
 Robert J. Anderson (1966–2006), American murderer
 Robert Bales (born 1973), former United States army soldier who committed the Kandahar massacre
 Robert John Bardo, American assassin of Rebecca Schaeffer
 Robert Biehler (1934–1993), American serial killer
 Robert Berdella, American serial killer, known as The Kansas City Butcher and The Collector
 Robert H. Birch, (c. 1827 – c. 1866), American criminal
 Robert Black (1947–2016), Scottish serial killer
 Robert Eugene Brashers (1958–1999), American serial killer and rapist
 Robert Charles Browne (born 1952), American murderer
 Robert Anthony Buell (1940–2002), American serial killer
 Robert Francis Burns (1840–1883), Irish Australian murderer and probable serial killer
 Robert Edward Chambliss (1904–1985), white supremacist terrorist 
 Robert Glen Coe (1956–2000), American murderer 
 Robert Wayne Danielson (1946–1995), American serial killer
 Robert Durst (1943–2022), American convicted murderer
 Robert Mark Edwards (born 1961), American murderer
 Robert William Fisher (born 1961), American fugitive
 Robert Newton Ford, 19th century American outlaw
 Robert Garrow, American spree killer
 Robert Hansen (1939–2014), American serial killer known as "The Butcher Baker"
 Robert Wayne Harris (1972–2012), American mass murderer and serial killer
 Robert Hawkins, mass murderer who perpetrated the Westroads Mall shooting
 Robert Dale Henderson (1945–1993), American spree killer
 Robert Hohenberger (1943–1978), American criminal, kidnapper and serial rapist
 Robert Wesley Knighton (1941–2003), American serial killer
 Robert Seldon Lady (born 1954), United States agent convicted of kidnapping in Italy
 Robert Liberty (1947–1971), American serial killer
 Robert A. Long, American spree killer who perpetrated the 2021 Atlanta spa shootings
 Robert "Bobby" Long, American serial killer and rapist
 Robert Jay Mathews (1953–1984), American neo-Nazi terrorist and the leader of The Order, an American white supremacist militant group
 Robert Maudsley, English serial killer
 Robert Napper, British serial killer
 Robert Palin (c.1835–1861), convict transported to Western Australia
 Robert Perrino (1938–1992), Bonanno crime family associate and murder victim
 Robert Pickton, Canadian serial killer
 Robert Ben Rhoades, American serial killer known as "The Truck Stop Killer"
 Robert Dale Rowell (1955–2005), American murderer
 Robert Lloyd Schellenberg, Canadian drug contrabandist
 Robert M. Shelton, leader of United Klans of America, a Ku Klux Klan group
 Robert Steinhäuser, German mass murderer and perpetrator of the Erfurt school massacre
 Robert Stroud, a convicted murderer, American federal prisoner and author known as the "Birdman of Alcatraz" who has been cited as one of the most notorious criminals in the United States
 Robert Tilton, American televangelist and fraudster
 Robert Trimbole, Australian businessman, drug baron and organized crime boss
 Robert Lee Yates, American serial killer from Spokane, Washington
 Robert Zarinsky (1940–2008), American murderer

Judges
 Robert J. Cindrich, American judge, former United States district judge of the United States District Court for the Western District of Pennsylvania 
 Robert H. Jackson, American attorney and judge who served as an Associate Justice of the United States Supreme Court, previously served as United States Solicitor General, and United States Attorney General, the Chief United States Prosecutor at the Nuremberg Trials
 Robert Morgenthau, American lawyer, District Attorney for New York County and United States Attorney for the Southern District of New York
 Robert Price, British judge and politician
 Robert Rajanayagam Selvadurai (1894–1973), Sri Lankan Tamil lawyer, police magistrate, and civil servant

Political figures
 Robert Buckland, Welsh Conservative Party politician and barrister who served as Solicitor General for England and Wales and Minister of State for Prisons, currently serving as Secretary of State for Justice and Lord Chancellor
 Robert J. Bulkley, United States Democratic Party Politician from Ohio;
 Robert Baird, American clergyman and author
 Robert Byrd, American lawyer and politician who served as a United States Senator from West Virginia for over 51 years, from 1959 until his death in 2010
 Robert Chadwick, Pennsylvania State Representative
 Robert J. Clendening, Pennsylvania State Representative
 Robert Crosser, U.S. Representative from Ohio, the longest serving member of the United States House of Representatives from the state of Ohio
 Robert "Bob" Dole, American politician and attorney who represented Kansas in the United States Senate from 1969 to 1996
 Robert Budd Dwyer, the 30th State Treasurer of the Commonwealth of Pennsylvania, best remembered for his public suicide on live TV;
 Robert Gichimu Githinji, Kenyan MP
 Robert A. Green, U.S Representative from Florida
 Arthur Robert Guinness, Zealand politician and Speaker of the House of Representatives
 Robert Gunawardena (1904–1971), founder of the Trotskyist Lanka Sama Samaja Party, diplomat
 Robert Habeck, German politician and writer, Vice Chancellor of Germany, Federal Minister for Economic Affairs and Climate Action
 Robert G. Harper, a Federalist, member of the United States Senate from Maryland, serving from January 1816 until December of the same year
 Robert H. Foerderer, U.S. Congressman from Pennsylvania from 1901 to 1903
 Robert M. La Follette Jr., U.S. senator from Wisconsin from 1925 to 1947
 Robert J. Gamble, Representative and Senator from South Dakota
 Robert Edward Jayatilaka, Sri Lankan Sinhala politician
 Sir Robert Laurie, 5th Baronet, Scottish soldier and politician who sat in the House of Commons from 1774 to 1804
 Robert Lee Henry, Democratic member of the United States House of Representatives from Texas from 1897 to 1917;
 Robert Hertzberg, American politician serving as Majority Leader in the California State Senate
 Robert Lowe, British statesman and pivotal figure who shaped British politics in the latter half of the 19th century
 Roberto Mangabeira Unger, Brazilian philosopher and politician
 Robert James Manion, Canadian politician best known for leading the Conservative Party of Canada from 1938 until 1940
 Robert Maxwell (1923–1991), Czechoslovak-born British media proprietor and member of parliament 
 Robert "Bob" Moses, American educator and civil rights activist
 Robert "Beto" O'Rourke, American politician 
 Robert Schmidt, Reich Minister of Food and Agriculture of Germany
 Robert Sobukwe, prominent South African political dissident and teacher who founded and became the first president of the Pan Africanist Congress
 Robert Roosevelt, a sportsman, author and politician who served as a United States representative from New York and as Minister to the Hague, brother of the president of America Theodore Roosevelt;
 Robert K. Steel, American businessman, financier and government official;
 Robert A. Taft, American conservative politician, lawyer, and scion of the Taft family;
 Robert L. "Bob" Turner, American businessman and politician 
 Robert F. Williams, American civil rights leader and author best known for serving as president of the Monroe, North Carolina chapter of the NAACP

Secretaries of War
 Robert Todd Lincoln, American politician, lawyer, and businessman, the first son of Abraham Lincoln, United States Secretary of War and United States Minister to the United Kingdom
 Robert P. Patterson, United States Secretary of War

Secretaries of State
 Lord Robert Crewe-Milnes, 1st Marquess of Crewe, Secretary of State for India during World War I and Lord Lieutenant of Ireland
 Robert M. T. Hunter, Virginia lawyer, politician and plantation owner, U.S. Representative (1837–1843, 1845–1847), Speaker of the House (1839–1841), and U.S. Senator (1847–1861), during the American Civil War, the Confederate States Secretary of State (1861–1862) and then a Confederate Senator (1862–1865)
 Robert Smith, second United States Secretary of the Navy from 1801 to 1809 and the sixth United States Secretary of State from 1809 to 1811
 Sir Robert Southwell, Irish diplomat, Secretary of State for Ireland and President of the Royal Society from 1690

Governors
 Robert J. Bentley, American politician and physician who served as the 53rd Governor of Alabama from 2011 until 2017;
 Robert Brooke, soldier and Virginia political figure who served as the tenth Governor of Virginia
 Robert Brooke, lieutenant-colonel in the army of Bengal and governor of the island of St Helena from 1788 to 1800
 Robert Carter I, American colonist, Colonial Governor of Virginia and Speaker of the Virginia House of Burgesses;
 Robert Stockton Green, American Democratic Party politician, who served as the 27th Governor of New Jersey from 1887 to 1890
 Robert Hunter, British military officer, colonial governor of New York and New Jersey from 1710 to 1720, and governor of Jamaica from 1727 to 1734;
 Robert M. La Follette, American lawyer and politician who served as the 20th Governor of Wisconsin;
 Robert S. Kerr, American businessman and politician, 12th Governor of Oklahoma
 Robert S. Kerr III, American politician, Lieutenant Governor of Oklahoma
 Robert Lowry, American politician and a Confederate States Army general during the American Civil War, who served as 32nd Governor of Mississippi;
 Robert D. Orr, American politician and diplomat who served as the 45th Governor of Indiana from 1981 to 1989
 Robert E. Quinn, American attorney and politician from Rhode Island who served as the 58th Governor of Rhode Island and Judge for the Rhode Island Superior Court
 Robert Marcellus Stewart, 14th Governor of Missouri from 1857 to 1861, during the years just prior to the American Civil War;
 Robert Yellowtail, leader of the Crow Nation, the first Native American to hold the post of Agency Superintendent at a reservation in the Crow Indian Reservation

Mayors
 Robert Worth Bingham, American politician, judge, United States Ambassador to the United Kingdom and mayor of Louisville, Kentucky
 Robert Brent, the first Mayor of Washington, D.C., the federal capital of the United States;
 Robert T. Conrad, the first mayor of Philadelphia to take office following the Consolidation Act of 1854;
 Robert "Rob" Ford, Canadian politician and businessman who served as the 64th Mayor of Toronto;
 Robert King High, American politician who served as 29th mayor of the city of Miami;
 Robert H. Morris, 64th mayor of New York City;
 Robert F. Wagner Jr., American politician who served three terms as the mayor of New York City from 1954 through 1965

Founding fathers of United States
 Robert R. Livingston, American lawyer, politician, diplomat from New York, 1st United States Secretary of Foreign Affairs, 1st Chancellor of New York and a Founding Father of the United States
 Robert Morris, English-born merchant, United States Secretary of the Navy, United States Superintendent of Finance and a Founding Father of the United States
 Robert Treat Paine, American lawyer, politician and Founding Father of the United States who signed the Continental Association and the Declaration of Independence as a representative of Massachusetts

Literary figures
 Robert Browning, English poet and playwright whose mastery of the dramatic monologue made him one of the foremost 19th century poets
 Robert Burns, Scottish/British poet and lyricist, widely regarded as the national poet of Scotland
 Robert Commanday, American music critic, chief classical music critic of the San Francisco Chronicle (1964–1994)
 Robert Cormier, American author and journalist, known for his deeply pessimistic novels
 Robert Frost, American poet
 Robert Hardman (born 1965), British journalist, author, and documentary filmmaker
 Robert Harris, English novelist and former BBC reporter
 Robert A. Heinlein, American science-fiction writer, one of the pioneers of hard science fiction genre
Robert Hichens, English journalist, novelist, music lyricist, short story writer, music critic
 Robert E. Howard, American author who wrote pulp fiction, well known for his character Conan the Barbarian, regarded as the father of the sword and sorcery subgenre
 Robert G. Ingersoll, American writer and orator during the Golden Age of Freethought, who campaigned in defense of agnosticism
 Robert "Bob" Kane, American comic book artist and writer, best known for creating the character Batman
 Robert Kirkman, American comic book author best known for creating The Walking Dead
 Robert "Rob" Liefeld, American comic book artist and writer, best known for creating the character Deadpool
 Robert Nozick, American philosopher and writer
 Robert Rozhdestvensky, Soviet Russian poet, regarded as one of the most significant Russian poets
 Robert W. Service, British-Canadian poet and writer
 Robert J.C. Stead, Canadian novelist 
 Robert Louis Stevenson, Scottish novelist, poet, essayist, musician and travel writer, best known for his work Treasure Island, which became one of the most popular literary works of all time
 Robert Anton Wilson,  American author, futurist, philosopher and self-described agnostic mystic, co-author (with Robert Shea) of The Illuminatus! Trilogy

Businessmen
 Robert Bosch, German industrialist, businessman, engineer and inventor, founder of Robert Bosch GmbH (Bosch)
 Robert Kardashian, American attorney and businessman
 Robert Kiyosaki, American businessman and author, founder of the Rich Dad Company
 Robert Kyncl, American business executive, Chief Business Officer of YouTube and former Vice President of Content Acquisitions of Netflix
 Robert Napier, Scottish marine engineer and founder of Robert Napier and Sons
 Robert Miles Sloman, English-German shipbuilder, ship owner and sailor
 Robert Smalls, American businessman, publisher, and politician
 Robert F. Smith, American billionaire, businessman, philanthropist, chemical engineer, and investor, founder, chairman, and CEO of private equity firm Vista Equity Partners 
 Robert Trump, American real estate developer and business executive, brother of the president of America Donald Trump
 Robert Winthrop, wealthy banker and capitalist in New York City

Administrators of NASA
 Robert A. Frosch, American scientist who was the fifth administrator of NASA from 1977 to 1981
 Robert M. Lightfoot Jr., engineer and former Acting Administrator of the National Aeronautics and Space Administration (NASA), serving from January 20, 2017, until April 23, 2018, making him the longest-serving Acting Administrator in NASA history

Astronauts
 Robert L. Behnken, United States Air Force officer, NASA astronaut and former Chief of the Astronaut Office
 Robert D. Cabana, director of NASA's John F. Kennedy Space Center, a former NASA astronaut, and a veteran of four Space Shuttle flights
 Robert J. Cenker, American aerospace and electrical engineer, aerospace systems consultant, and former astronaut
 Robert Crippen, American retired naval officer and aviator, test pilot, aerospace engineer, and retired astronaut
 Robert Curbeam, former NASA astronaut and captain in the United States Navy
 Robert L. Gibson, former American naval officer and aviator, test pilot, aeronautical engineer, and a retired NASA astronaut, as well as a professional pilot and regular racer at the annual Reno Air Races
 Robert S. Kimbrough, retired United States Army officer, and a NASA astronaut
 Robert Lawrence Jr., a United States Air Force officer and the first African-American astronaut
 Robert F. Overmyer, American test pilot, naval aviator, aeronautical engineer, physicist, United States Marine Corps officer and USAF/NASA astronaut
 Robert A. Parker, American physicist and astronomer, former Director of the NASA Management Office at the Jet Propulsion Laboratory, and a retired NASA astronaut
 Robert Satcher, American physician, chemical engineer and NASA astronaut
 Robert C. Springer, retired American astronaut and test pilot
 Robert L. Stewart, retired brigadier general of the United States Army and a former NASA astronaut
 Robert Thirsk, a Canadian engineer and physician, and a former Canadian Space Agency astronaut
 Roberto Vittori, Italian air force officer and an ESA astronaut

Sportsmen
 Robert Alexander, Irish sportsman
 Roberto Baggio, Italian former professional footballer who mainly played as a second striker, or as an attacking midfielder
 Roberto Carlos, Brazilian footballer, widely regarded as one of the best football players of all time
 Robért Conway, American professional wrestler
 Robert Fein (1907–1975), Austrian Olympic champion weightlifter
 Robert Gibson (1801–1???), English cricketer
 Robert Gibson (1821–1875), English cricketer
 Robert Gibson (born 1958), American wrestler
 Robert Gibson (born 1986), Canadian rower
 Robert Green, English professional footballer who played as a goalkeeper, played in the Premier League and Football League and for the England national team
 Robert Griffin III, American football quarterback for the Baltimore Ravens of the National Football League
 Robert Gsellman (born 1993), American baseball player
 Robert Helenius, Finnish professional boxer
 Robert Howard, Irish Grandmaster of taekwondo
 Robert "Bobby" Hull, Canadian former ice hockey player who is regarded as one of the greatest players of all time
 Róbert Jež, retired Slovak footballer
 Robert "Bob" Kalsu, American football player and United States Army officer
 Robert Kerr, Irish Canadian sprinter
 Robert "Robbie" Kerr, British racing driver
Robert Kubica, Polish racing driver
 Robert Lewandowski, Polish football player who plays as a striker for FC Barcelona and is the captain of the Poland national team
 Roberto López Ufarte, Basque former footballer
 Roberto Mancini, Italian football manager and former player who is the manager of the Italy national team
 Robert "Bob" McNamara, American baseball player
 Robert Alexander Michel Melki (born 1992), Swedish-Lebanese footballer
 Robert Mühren, Dutch professional footballer
 Robert Person (born 1969), American baseball player
 Robert "Bobby" Orr, Canadian former professional ice hockey player, widely acknowledged as one of the greatest of all time
 Robert Remus, American professional wrestler known as Sgt. Slaughter
 Robert "Rob" Terry, Welsh professional wrestler and bodybuilder
 Robert Whittaker, New Zealand-born Australian professional mixed martial artist
 Robert Wickens, Canadian racing driver

Paranormal
 Robert the Doll, a supposedly haunted doll exhibited at a museum, center of an urban legend

Others
 Robert Barclay Allardice, generally known as Captain Barclay, Scottish walker of the early 19th century, known as the celebrated pedestrian, considered the father of the 19th century sport of pedestrianism, a precursor to racewalking
 Robert T. Barrett, American painter, illustrator, and professor of illustration at Brigham Young University 
 Robert "Rob" Bell Jr., American author, speaker and former pastor
 Rob Bell, American TV host and adventurer
 Robert Bevan, British painter, draughtsman and lithographer, founding member of the Camden Town Group, the London Group, and the Cumberland Market Group
 Robert S. Browne (1924–2004), American economist
 Robert Capa, Hungarian war photographer and photojournalist
 Robert Chung, Hong Kong academician, former Director of the Public Opinion Programme (POP) of the University of Hong Kong, head of the Hong Kong Public Opinion Research Institute
 Robert Conquest, an English-American historian and poet
 Robert Cornelius, American pioneer of photography and a lamp manufacturer who took the first light picture ever taken and whose self-taken portrait is the first known photographic portrait taken in America
 Robert de Cotte, French architect-administrator, under whose design control of the royal buildings of France the earliest notes presaging the Rococo style were introduced
 Robert G. Elliott, American executioner
 Robert Elms, English writer and broadcaster
 Robert Garrow (1936–1978), American serial rapist and later spree killer 
 Robert Gibbings, Irish artist and author who was most noted for his work as a wood engraver and sculptor
 Robert Gregg, Anglican Archbishop
 Robert Gray, first Anglican Bishop of Cape Town and Metropolitan of Africa
 Robert Gray, English Bishop of Bristol
 Robert Gray, American merchant sea captain who pioneered the maritime fur trade
 Robert H. Gray, American data analyst, author and astronomer
Robert Grierson, Canadian missionary to Korea
 Roparz Hemon (Robert Hemon), Breton author and scholar of Breton expression
 Robert Henri, American painter and teacher
 Robert Hichens, British sailor who was part of the deck crew on board the RMS Titanic as one of six quartermasters on board the vessel and was at the ships wheel when it struck the iceberg
 Carl Robert Jakobson, Estonian writer, politician and teacher, one of the most important people in the Estonian national awakening
 Robert Knox, Irish bishop
 Robert Lopez, award-winning American songwriter of musicals, best known for co-creating The Book of Mormon and Avenue Q, and for composing the songs featured in the 3D Disney computer animated films Frozen and Coco
 Roberto Matta, of Chilean painter and a seminal figure in 20th century abstract expressionist and surrealist art
 Bob Moir (1929–2016) was a Canadian television producer, sports commentator, and journalist
 Robert Molyneux, English-American Catholic priest and Jesuit missionary to the United States
 Robert de Montesquiou, French aesthete, Symbolist poet and art collector
 Captain Robert Nairac, British Army officer in 14 Intelligence Company who was abducted from a pub in Dromintee, south County Armagh, during an undercover operation and assassinated by the Provisional Irish Republican Army (IRA) on his fourth tour of duty in Northern Ireland as a Military Intelligence Liaison Officer
 Robert M. Price, American theologian and writer
 Robert "Bob" Ross, American painter, art instructor, and television host
 Robert O. Scholz, American architect from Washington, D.C.
 Robert Livingston Rudolph, American bishop of the Reformed Episcopal Church
 Robert Stevens, British-born American photojournalist killed in the 2001 anthrax attacks
 Robert Scotland Liddell, British war reporter and photographer
 Robert Topala, also known as Zhenmuron, Swedish musician and video game developer known for developing the popular rhythm based arcade art game Geometry Dash
 Robert Barron (bishop), American prelate of the Catholic Church, author, theologian and evangelist, known for his Word on Fire ministry
 Robert Wadlow, known as the Alton Giant and the Giant of Illinois, an American who became famous as the tallest person in recorded history
 Robert Wipper, Russian historian of classical antiquity, medieval and modern period

Fictional characters
 Robert "Rocky" Balboa, the main character in the Rocky Balboa film series;
 King Robert Baratheon, a fictional king in A Song of Ice and Fire novels by George R. R. Martin & the 2011 TV series Game of Thrones (King of the Andals, the Rhoynar and the First Men, Lord of the Seven Kingdoms, Protector of the Realm, Lord of Storm's End, Lord Paramount of the Stormlands)
 Commander Robert Hicks, A senior officer with the LAPD Special Operations Bureau in 2017 TV series S.W.A.T.
 Robert, main character of the 2021 action thriller Roberrt 
 Robert Barone, a character from the 1996 sitcom Everybody Loves Raymond
Robert Baxter, one of the main characters in the video game Time Crisis II, later the main antagonist of Time Crisis 5
 Robert Blake, main character in the story The Haunter of the Dark by H.P. Lovecraft
 Robert the Devil, main character of a legend of medieval origin about a Norman knight who discovers he is the son of Satan
 Robert "Yokai" Callaghan, a former robotics professor at the San Fransokyo Institute of Technology and the main antagonist of Big Hero 6
 Robert Philip, one of the main characters in the 2007 film Enchanted
 Robert Jürgens, owner of Griffolyon, character from the Japanese Manga series Beyblade 
 Robert Drake, fictional superhero known as Iceman, appearing in comic books published by Marvel Comics, a founding member of the X-Men
 Robert Ford, main character in TV series Westworld
 Robert "Rob" Smith, character from the TV series The Goldbergs 
 Robert Langdon, symbologist and cryptologist in Dan Brown's novels Angels & Demons, The Da Vinci Code, The Lost Symbol & Inferno, the 2006 film The Da Vinci Code & the 2009 film Angels & Demons
 Robert McGonagall, father of Minerva McGonagall, the transfiguration teacher and Head of Gryffindor House in the Harry Potter franchise;
 Robert "Bobby" Nash, a firefighter in TV series 9-1-1
 Robert Neville, a main protagonist and US Army Virologist in 2007 movie I Am Legend;
 Robert "Bob" Newby, a character from the TV series Stranger Things
 Robert Paulson, a character in Chuck Palahniuk's novel Fight Club and the 1999 film of the same name
 Robert "Bob" Fossil, a zoo owner in the TV series The Mighty Boosh
 Robert Reynolds, a Marvel Comics Superhero known as Sentry
 Robbie Rotten, the main villain in LazyTown since the second play, Glanni Glæpur í Latabæ (Robbie Rotten in LazyTown);
 Robert "Robbie" Shapiro, character from TV series Victorious
 Robert "Bobby" Singer, fictional character in The CW Television Network's horror-drama television series Supernatural
 Robert The Scotsman, character from animated series Samurai Jack
 Robert "Bob" Stone, main character, CIA agent and martial arts specialist from the action comedy Central Intelligence
 Robert "Robb" Stark, a fictional character in A Song of Ice and Fire novels by George R. R. Martin & the 2011 TV series Game of Thrones
 Robert Chan, chief executive of Umbrella Corps in Resident Evil franchise
 Robert "Bob" Kendo, a character from Resident Evil franchise
 Robert, character from the Lithuanian soap opera Moterys meluoja geriau (Women lie better) and its Latvian version Viņas melo labāk
 Robert T. Sturgeon, video game character in the Ninja Gaiden series
 Robert "Bob" Gray, real name of the character known as It or Pennywise the Dancing Clown from the horror story and movies of the same name
 Sponge Robert "Bob" SquarePants, title character of the animated series SpongeBob SquarePants
 Robert "Bob" the Builder, a character from the British animated series Bob the Builder
 Robert Seaver, a character from Homeward Bound: The Incredible Journey 
 Robert Bruce Banner, a major character featured in Marvel Comics, known as The Incredible Hulk
 Dr Robert Gru, character from the Despicable Me franchise
 Robert "Bob" Parr, a fictional superhero known as Mr Incredible from The Incredibles franchise
 Robert Underdunk Terwilliger, known as Sideshow Bob, a character from the animated series The Simpsons
 Robert Accutrone, a Quincy and a member of the Wandenreich's Sternritter with the designation "N" from the Bleach manga
 Robert Stanton, a character from the American horror franchise Five Nights at Freddy's
Robert Garcia, a characters from the Art of Fighting and The King of Fighters series of video games

Folklore
 Robert Goodfellow, domestic and nature sprite, demon, or fairy in mythology
 Knight Robert, a legendary Christmas character from German folklore
 Robert, one of the names often used to refer to a legendary Christmas character known as Krampus
 Robert, one of the names often used to refer to the Devil in mythology

See also
 Rob (given name), short for Robert
 Robby, nickname for Robert
 Robbie, nickname for Robert
 Bob (given name), nickname for Robert
 Bobby (given name), nickname for Robert
 Roberts (surname)
 Robertson (surname)
 Roberson
 Rupert (name), alternate version of Robert
 Robin (name), formerly a nickname for Robert
 Robinson (name)
 Robinett
 Robinet
 Robinette

References

English-language masculine given names
English masculine given names
German masculine given names
Dutch masculine given names
Germanic given names
French masculine given names
Romanian masculine given names
Norwegian masculine given names
Swedish masculine given names
Danish masculine given names
Estonian masculine given names
Icelandic masculine given names
Irish masculine given names
Scottish masculine given names